Xingcheng railway station is a railway station in Xingcheng, Huludao, Liaoning, China.

Railway stations in Liaoning
Stations on the Beijing–Harbin Railway